This is a list of notable student newspapers in the United Kingdom.

National
Affairs Today
The Gateway (business and careers focus)
The National Student
The Student Journals
Student Times newspaper
The Tab
 Nowadays
 Etonomics
The Student Pocket Guide

England
University of Bath — BathImpact
University of Birmingham — Redbrick
Arts University Bournemouth — BUMF
Bournemouth University — The BUzz, The Rock
University of Brighton - The Verse
University of Bristol — Epigram
British and Irish Modern Music Institute - LDN Music Magazine (London)
Brunel University London — Le Nurb
University of Cambridge — The Cambridge Student (TCS), Varsity, The Berry (political)
Canterbury Christ Church University — UNIfied
Cecil Jones Academy — CU@Cecil
University of Central Lancashire — The Pulse
University College London - UCL Pi Media
Court Moor School — CMS Newspaper
Dartford Grammar School — DGSChapter
Durham University — Palatinate, The Bubble
Eton College — The Chronicle 
University of East Anglia — Concrete
University of Essex — The Rabbit
University of Exeter — Exeposé
Falmouth University & University of Exeter, Cornwall campuses — The Falmouth Anchor
Goldsmiths, University of London — The Leopard
University of Greenwich, — Latitude Lookout
University of Gloucestershire -UniVersal News
Harrow School — The Harrovian
Heythrop College, University of London — The Lion
University of Hull — The Hullfire
Imperial College London — Felix
The Knights Templar School — KTS NewsKnight
Kingston University — The River
King's College London — Roar News
Keele University — Concourse
University of Kent — InQuire (union funded), and UniON
Lancaster University — SCAN
University of Leeds — Leeds Student
University of Leicester — Leicester Student Magazine
University of Lincoln — The Linc
University of Liverpool — The Sphinx
London College of Communication, University of the Arts London — The Artefact
University of London — London Student
King's College London — Roar News
London School of Economics — The Beaver
Royal Holloway, University of London — The Orbital (official), and The Founder (unofficial)
School of Oriental and African Studies — The SOAS Spirit
Queen Mary, University of London — The Print
Loughborough University — The Epinal
Manchester Metropolitan University — Humanity Hallows (official) 
Merchant Taylors’ School — The Dependent (unofficial) 
University of Manchester — The Mancunion (official), and The Manchester Magazine (independent)
Newcastle University — The Courier
Northumbria University — Northumbria Student
University of Nottingham — Impact
Nottingham Trent University — Platform Magazine
Oxford Brookes University — The Underdog
Oundle School — Oundle Chronicle
University of Oxford — The Oxford Blue, The Oxford Student, Cherwell, The Isis
University of Portsmouth — The Galleon
University of Plymouth — The Knowledge
University of Reading — The Spark
Richmond upon Thames College — NOISE
Roehampton University — Fresh
University of Sheffield — Forge Press
University of Southampton — Wessex Scene, The Edge (magazine)
University of Surrey — The Stag 
University of Sussex — The Badger
University of Warwick — The Boar
Westminster Abbey Choir School — Wacs lyrical
University of Westminster — The Quintin Hogg (The QH)
University of the West of England — WesternEye
University of Worcester — The Voice
University of York — Nouse (pronounced Nooze, rhymes with Ouse), and York Vision (pronounced 'Fork Visor', rhymes with Stalk Riser)

Northern Ireland
Queen's University Belfast — The Gown

Scotland
University of Aberdeen — Gaudie
University of Edinburgh — The Student
University of Glasgow — Glasgow University Guardian
University of St Andrews — The Saint (Tabloid)
University of Stirling — Brig Newspaper
University of Strathclyde — Strathclyde Telegraph
Napier University — Veritas
Edinburgh-wide — The Journal
Scotland-wide — Scotcampus
Scotland-wide — The Student Advertiser (TSA)
University of Dundee — The Magdalen

Wales
Aberystwyth University — The Courier
Bangor University — Seren
Cardiff University — gair rhydd
Glamorgan University — Leek
Swansea University — The Waterfront
University of Wales, Lampeter — 1822
University of Wales, Newport — NewsPort

References

See also
Student newspaper
List of student newspapers
List of student newspapers in Australia
List of student newspapers in Canada
List of student newspapers in the United States of America

 
Student
News